Pantywaun Halt railway station served the hamlet of Pantywaun and village of Bute Town, Caerphilly, Wales on the Brecon and Merthyr Tydfil Junction Railway. The site of the halt does not appear on os maps but was likely in private ownership. Nothing remains of the halt.

References

External links 

Disused railway stations in Caerphilly County Borough
Former Great Western Railway stations
Railway stations in Great Britain opened in 1941
Railway stations in Great Britain closed in 1962
1941 establishments in Wales
1962 disestablishments in Wales